The 2004 Wakefield Metropolitan District Council election took place on 10 June 2004 to elect members of Wakefield Metropolitan District Council in West Yorkshire, England. The whole council was up for election with boundary changes since the last election in 2003. The Labour party stayed in overall control of the council.

Campaign
Before the election Labour held 50 of the 63 seats on the council and this was seen as being an insurmountable majority for the other parties. However the Conservatives stood a full slate of 63 candidates and were hopeful of making gains due to dissatisfaction among Labour supporters. The British National Party stood 12 candidates in the election, a substantial increase on the 2 they had stood in the 2003 election but not the 20 candidates the party had been hoping to stand. Other candidates included 19 Liberal Democrats, 18 independents, 5 Socialist Alternative, 3 from the United Kingdom Independence Party and 1 Green Party. All postal voting in the election was expected to increase turnout, which was seen by analysts as making the results difficult to predict.

Election result
The results saw Labour lose 7 seats but remained firmly in control of the council with 43 of the 63 seats. The Conservatives gained 4 and the independents 3, with the gains for the independents in Featherstone being put down to the closure of a local swimming pool. The Liberal Democrats held their 3 seats in Ossett but neither they nor the British National Party made any gains. Overall voter turnout was 39.6%.

Labour saw the results as not being as bad as they could have been given the losses the party was suffering nationally, which was put down to improved services and listening to local people. Meanwhile, the Conservatives were disappointed that they had not made more gains.

Ward results

References

2004 English local elections
2004
2000s in West Yorkshire